Intercontinental de Aviación S.A. (English;  and Inter for short) was an airline based in Bogotá, Colombia. It operated domestic services and flights to neighboring countries. Its main hub was located at El Dorado International Airport in Bogotá, with a secondary hub at Alfonso Bonilla Aragón International Airport in Cali. The airline closed operations in 2005.

History

The airline was founded and started operations on October 16, 1960 as Aeropesca Colombia.

The company had several accidents, and was sold to a group of shareholders who changed their name and image to Intercontinental de Aviacion in 1982. Only one Vickers Viscount and the Curtiss C-46 Commando left the company. A McDonnell Douglas DC-9-15 and another Vickers Viscount were purchased, and on June 3, 1983, it began operating from Bogotá to the west.

In 1986 it changed shareholders, consolidated itself as a developing company and became a competition for Avianca and SAM. The airline began operating international flights in 1991, and in 1993 more DC-9-15 and De Havilland DHC-8 were acquired. The Executive Class and VIP lounges began to be offered in Bogotá, Cali, Medellín and Barranquilla. In October 2000, four Beechcraft 1900Ds were purchased, as well as two Boeing 737-300s, both types however were never operated.

Following the crash of West Caribbean Airways Flight 708 in Venezuela, the Colombian Civil Aviation Authority required that all airlines undergo a special inspection of its maintenance facilities and aircraft. The airline was forced to cease operations in September 2005 as it did not pass these inspections.

Destinations

National

Arauca (Santiago Pérez Quiroz Airport)
Barranquilla (Ernesto Cortissoz International Airport)
Bogotá (El Dorado International Airport) Hub
Bucaramanga (Palonegro International Airport)
Cali (Alfonso Bonilla Aragón International Airport) Hub
Cartagena (Rafael Núñez International Airport)
Corozal (Las Brujas Airport)
Cúcuta (Camilo Daza International Airport)
Florencia (Gustavo Artunduaga Paredes Airport)
Ipiales (San Luis Airport)
Maicao (Jorge Isaacs Airport)
Medellín (Olaya Herrera Airport)
Medellín (José María Córdova International Airport)
Neiva (Benito Salas Airport)
Pasto (Antonio Nariño Airport)
Pereira (Matecaña International Airport)
Popayán (Guillermo León Valencia Airport)
Riohacha (Almirante Padilla Airport)
San Andrés (Gustavo Rojas Pinilla International Airport)
Tumaco (La Florida Airport)
Valledupar (Alfonso López Pumarejo Airport)

International

Habana (José Martí International Airport)

Esmeraldas (Colonel Carlos Concha Torres Airport)
Tulcán (Teniente Coronel Luis A. Mantilla International Airport)

Panama City (Tocumen International Airport)

Maracaibo (La Chinita International Airport)
San Antonio del Táchira (Juan Vicente Gómez International Airport)
Valencia (Arturo Michelena International Airport)

Fleet

Aeropesca and Inter consisted of the following fleet:

4 Beechcraft 1900D (not operated)
1 Boeing 727-100
2 Boeing 737-300 (not operated)
2 Bombardier Dash 8 Q300
1 Consolidated PBY Catalina
8 Curtiss C-46 Commando
1 de Havilland Canada DHC-6 Twin Otter (not operated)
3 Lockheed PV-2 Harpoon
1 Lockheed Model 18 Lodestar
7 McDonnell Douglas DC-9-14
12 McDonnell Douglas DC-9-15
1 McDonnell Douglas DC-9-32 (Impounded)
3 Vickers Viscount

Accidents and incidents
On November 4, 1965, a Consolidated PBY Catalina (registered HK-811) went missing during a domestic flight. Four of the six occupants on board were discovered 9 days later near the Peruvian border.

On July 11, 1966, a Curtiss C-46 Commando (registration HK-527) went missing over mountainous terrain during a flight from Bogotá to Buenos Aires. The aircraft was carrying eight bulls for an exhibition in Buenos Aires. All 8 occupant on board were killed.

On January 5, 1974, a Lockheed Model 18 Lodestar (registered HK-1146) had a landing gear failure during takeoff at Bogotá. The aircraft returned to the airport and tried to land, however the brakes were ineffective, causing it overshoot the runway and coming to rest in a drainage ditch. All 5 occupants on board survived.

On January 21, 1974, a Vickers Viscount was hijacked and diverted to Cali.

On August 14, 1978, a Curtiss C-46 Commando (registration HK-1350) flying in worsening weather conditions drifted off course during a flight from Bogotá to Tame and crashed into Mount Paramo de Laura near Tota, Colombia, killing all 18 people in board. Certified to carry only six passengers, it had 15 passengers on board at the time of the crash.

On August 26, 1981, Aeropesca Colombia Flight 221, a Vickers Viscount (registered HK-1320), flew into Mount Santa Elena killing all 50 people on board.

On March 26, 1982, a Vickers Viscount (registered HK-2382) flew into a mountain near Queate while on a flight from La Vanguardia Airport to El Dorado International Airport, killing all 21 people on board.

On March 31, 1991, a Vickers Viscount (registered HK-1708) was damaged beyond economic repair while on a flight from El Dorado International Airport to Gustavo Rojas Pinilla International Airport. The lower main spar was found to have cracked. The aircraft had previously suffered a gear collapse on February 14, 1988.

On January 11, 1995, Intercontinental de Aviación Flight 256, a McDonnell Douglas DC-9-14 (registered HK-3839X), crashed on approach near María La Baja. The accident killed 52 passengers and crew; one person survived the crash.

On September 14, 1997, a Bombardier Dash 8 Q300 (registered HK-4062X) was on a flight from San Andrés to Pereira, via Bogotá. As the aircraft  landed at Matecaña International Airport, the nose and left main undercarriage, followed by the right main undercarriage, collapsed. All 39 passengers and 5 crew members survived. The aircraft was damaged beyond repairs and was written off; however, it was preserved at Bojacá on a private farmland for ground equipment.

On June 14, 2002, a DC-9-14 (registered HK-3859X) overshot the runway on landing at Benito Salas Airport. All 65 passengers and 6 crew members survived, while the aircraft was written off.

See also
List of defunct airlines of Colombia

References

External links
Airline Codes website
Intercontinental de Aviación in Aviacol.net
Flight International, 5–11 April 2005

Defunct airlines of Colombia
Airlines established in 1960
Airlines disestablished in 2005
Defunct companies of Colombia